"I'm So Hood" is a song by American musician DJ Khaled's featuring American rappers T-Pain, Trick Daddy, Rick Ross, and Plies, released as the second single from the former's second studio album We the Best (2007). "I'm So Hood" is one of Khaled's best-known songs.

Music video
The video was shot in Liberty City, Miami, Florida. It features cameo appearances from Birdman, Busta Rhymes, Fat Joe, and Triple C's.

Remixes
The official remix of "I'm So Hood" features hip-hop rappers Jeezy, Ludacris, Busta Rhymes, Big Boi, Lil Wayne, Fat Joe, Birdman and a new verse from Rick Ross. At the 2008 BET Hip Hop Awards, the official remix won the award for best collaboration.

An alternate remix is a rock remix featuring guitar work performed by Jamey Jasta of metal/hardcore band Hatebreed.

ByrdGang made a remix entitled "I'm So Hood (Byrd Gang Remix)" that can be found on the Members Of Byrdgang 2 (M.O.B) mixtape.

British rapper Kano has made a freestyle to the song on his MC No. 1 mixtape.

Charts

Weekly charts

Year-end charts

Certifications

References

External links
DJ Khaled - "I'm So Hood" music video at KOvideo.net

2007 singles
DJ Khaled songs
Rick Ross songs
T-Pain songs
Trick Daddy songs
Plies (rapper) songs
Jeezy songs
Ludacris songs
Busta Rhymes songs
Big Boi songs
Lil Wayne songs
Fat Joe songs
Birdman (rapper) songs
Songs written by T-Pain
Songs written by Trick Daddy
Music videos directed by Gil Green
Songs written by Rick Ross
Songs written by Jermaine Jackson (hip hop producer)
Songs written by Andrew Harr
Gangsta rap songs
2007 songs
MNRK Music Group singles